Barrie Smith (born 28 August 1939) is a former Australian rules footballer who played for the Carlton Football Club in the Victorian Football League (VFL).

Notes

External links 

Barrie Smith's profile at Blueseum

1939 births
Carlton Football Club players
Tatura Football Club players
Australian rules footballers from Victoria (Australia)
Living people